Walchand Institute of Technology (WIT), established in 1983, is the oldest engineering college in Solapur, India. Now it is first autonomous Engineering institute of Solapur. WIT is managed by Shri Aillak Pannalal Digambar Jain Pathashala Trust and is named after Seth Walchand Hirachand, one of India's pioneers of industrial development.

The facilities provided at the college have been adjudged amongst the best, according to an independent Newspaper study and by an inspiration team of Directorate of Technical Education, Maharashtra.

The institute is affiliated with Solapur University (previously to Shivaji University ) and is approved by the All India Council for Technical Education, New Delhi. The institute began with production engineering, environmental engineering, and electronics engineering branches.

Graduate courses
 Civil Engineering
 Computer Science and Engineering
 Electronics and Telecommunication Engineering
 Electronics and Computer Engineering
 Information Technology
 Mechanical and Automation Engineering

Post-graduate courses
 Civil Engineering- Structural Engineering
 Mechanical Engineering -  Design Engineering
 Computer Science and Engineering
 Electronics Engineering

Governing body
 Chairman (SAPDJ Pathashala, Solapur): Shri. Arvind R. Doshi, industrialist
 Member: Seth. Vinod L. Doshi, industrialist
 Member: Shri. Chakor L. Doshi, industrialist
 Member: Dr. Ranjeet H. Gandhi, Hon. Secretary and Trustee of SAPDJ Pathashala, Solapur
 Member: Shri Surel S. Shah, Advocate and Trustee
 Member: Shri. Rajiv D Sahani, (ex officio) Regional Officer, nominee of AICTE
 Member: Prin. Dr. S. D. Madnaik, (nominee) Technologist/educationist
 Member: Prof. S. T. Nawre, nominee Shivaji University, Kolhapur
 Member: Shri. N. B. Pasalkar, (ex officio) nominee of State Government, Director of Technical Education, Mumbai
 Member: Prof. D.M. Dewaikar, (nominee) Technologist/educationist
 Member: Dr. S.A. Halkude, (Secretary) Principal of the Institute

Institutions run by the trust
 Walchand College of Arts and Science and P.G.T. section M.A., Solapur.
 Walchand Junior College of Arts and Science, Solapur 
 Walchand College, M.S.W. Department, Solapur
 Hirachand Nemchand College of Commerce and P.G.T. section M.Com., Solapur
 Hirachand Nemchand Junior College of Commerce, Solapur
 Hirachand Nemchand Institute of Management and Research - M.B.A. and D.C.M., Solapur
 Kasturbai College of Education, Solapur
 Shri.D.J.Gurukul Junior Commerce and Vocational College, Solapur
 Shri.D.J.Gurukul High School, Solapur
 Nutan Vidyalaya, Ashti
 Shri. Deshbhushan Kulbhushan High School, Kunthalgiri

References

External links
 

All India Council for Technical Education
Engineering colleges in Maharashtra
Education in Solapur
Educational institutions established in 1983
1983 establishments in Maharashtra
Walchand Group